Kolly  may refer to:

 Gilbert Kolly (born 1951), Swiss judge
 Herbert Kolly (born 1969), Swiss freestyle skier
 Rachel Kolly d'Alba (born 1981), Swiss violinist
 Sandra Kolly (born 1974), Swiss sport shooter
 Urs Kolly (born 1968), Swiss athlete

See also

 Colly (disambiguation)
 Koly